The 2013–14 Utah State Aggies women's basketball team represents Utah State University in the 2013–14 college basketball season. The Aggies, led by second year head coach Jerry Finkbeiner. The Aggies played their home games at the Smith Spectrum and were a newly member of the Mountain West Conference. They finished the season 15–16, 8–10 in Mountain West play to finish in eighth place. They advanced to the quarterfinals of the Mountain West women's tournament where they lost to Colorado State.

Roster

Schedule

|-
!colspan=9 style="background:#002654; color:#FFFFFF;"| Exhibition

|-
!colspan=9 style="background:#002654; color:#FFFFFF;"| Regular Season

|-
!colspan=9 style="background:#002654; color:#FFFFFF;"| Mountain West Women's Tournament

See also
2013–14 Utah State Aggies men's basketball team

References 

Utah State
Utah State Aggies women's basketball seasons
Aggies
Aggies